"Gold" is a song by English boy band East 17, taken from the band's debut album, Walthamstow (1993). Written by Tony Mortimer, it was released on 2 November 1992 as the second single from the album. The song was successful in only a few countries, peaking at number two in Sweden, number three in Finland, and number 28 in the UK. Outside Europe, it reached number one for four weeks in Israel.

Critical reception
Sharon Mawer from AllMusic felt the song could easily have been recorded by the Pet Shop Boys, "as the intro and chorus had their lush orchestration and smooth vocals, although the verses featured Tony Mortimer rapping about the futility of war and the need to live together in harmony on this planet." In his weekly UK chart commentary, James Masterton wrote, "With their tracks having a harder dance feel to them unlike most teen bands their future looks set to follow soundalikes EMF. Watch this climb." Alan Jones from Music Week gave the song three out of five, describing it as "energetic and slick pop, with the Walthamstow boys more in control of their own destiny." In his review of the Walthamstow album, Neil Spencer from The Observer found that "House of Love" and "Gold" "prove the more inane offerings from a mix of junior hip-hop and melodic pop". Mark Frith from Smash Hits also gave it three out of five, saying it's "quite good — memorable, light and poppy".

Music video
A music video was produced to promote the single, directed by Jaswinder Bancil. It depicts the band performing the track whilst wearing angel wings.

Track listings
 CD and cassette single
 "Gold" (7-inch Collar Size)
 "Gold" (The Dark Bark mix)
 "Gold" (Paws on the Floor mix)
 "Gold" (The Rabid mix)

 7-inch single
A. "Gold" (7-inch Collar Size)
B. "Gold" (The Soho demo)

 12-inch single
A1. "Gold" (The Dark Bark mix)
A2. "Gold" (The Techno Bonio mix) 
B1. "Gold" (Paws on the Floor mix)
B2. "Gold" (The Rabid mix)

Charts

References

1992 singles
1992 songs
East 17 songs
Number-one singles in Israel
Songs written by Tony Mortimer